Joyce Collins Bulifant (born December 16, 1937) is an American actress and author. In addition to recurring roles on television, including The Mary Tyler Moore Show as Marie Slaughter, Bulifant is recognized for film roles in The Happiest Millionaire and Airplane! and as a frequent panelist on game shows, including Chain Reaction, Match Game, and Password Plus.

Early years
Bulifant was born in Newport News, Virginia. She attended Solebury School in New Hope, Pennsylvania, graduating in 1956 in the same class as her first husband, James MacArthur, son of Helen Hayes and Charles MacArthur. She then studied acting at the American Academy of Dramatic Arts.

Theatre
Bulifant's Broadway credits include Tall Story (1958) and The Paisley Convertible (1966).

She appeared in Glad Tidings; Auntie Mame; Gentlemen, The Queens!; and Under the Yum-Yum Tree.

She has written and performed autobiographical shows, Life Upon the Wicked Stage and Remembering Helen Hayes with Love, about her former mother-in-law, Helen Hayes, as well as Lillian Gish.

Television

Regular cast
One of Bulifant's earliest roles on television was as a dancer on Arthur Murray's Dance Party (1950–1960). She played Timmie Barnes in Too Young to Go Steady (1959), Mary Gentry in Tom, Dick and Mary (1964–1965), Marie Slaughter on The Mary Tyler Moore Show (1970–1977), Peggy Wilson on Love Thy Neighbor (1973), Lois on It's a Man's World (1962–1963), Marsha Patterson on The Bill Cosby Show (1969–1971), Marjorie Martin on Big John, Little John (1976–1977), and Alice Wurlitzer on The Bad News Bears (1979–1980). She was heard as the voice of Queen Vanda on the syndicated cartoon series Sport Billy (1982).

Guest appearances
Bulifant guest-starred as Jessica in Tales of Wells Fargo, episode "Fraud," in 1961, in addition to episodes of Channing; Empire; The Virginian; Bonanza; Gunsmoke; Wagon Train; Destry Rides Again; The Real McCoys; McHale's Navy; Dr. Kildare; Naked City; Police Woman; My Three Sons; Love, American Style; The Facts of Life; Harper Valley PTA; The Bad News Bears; Alice; Three's Company; The Joey Bishop Show; and The Donald O'Connor Show.

She played an intended murder victim in a 1961 episode of Boris Karloff's Thriller (episode: "An Attractive Family").

She starred opposite her future husband, Roger Perry, in a 1962 pilot for General Electric Theater called "The First Hundred Years" and with Eva Le Galliene in The Play of the Week Thérèse Raquin. She played Jenny Logan, the incorruptible wife of Tom Logan, played by Frank Aletter, both of whom were being tempted by Mr. Lucifer, played by Fred Astaire, and Mr. Lucifer's assistant, Iris Hecate, played by Elizabeth Montgomery, in "Mr. Lucifer," a 1962 episode of Alcoa Presents.

She played innocent defendant Nancy Banks in the Perry Mason 1964 episode "The Case of the Ice-Cold Hands," the second of two appearances on that show.

She played Miriam Willoughby on Flo and David Spade's mother on Just Shoot Me!

From 1994 to 1997, she played Emily Wallace, the mother of her real-life son John Asher, in Weird Science.

Television movies 
Bulifant appeared in Hanging by a Thread, Better Late Than Never, Little Women, Charley's Aunt, and The Shining.

Game shows 
Bulifant appeared as a frequent guest on game shows including Name That Tune, Password, Match Game, Crosswits, Tattletales, To Tell the Truth, $25,000 Pyramid, and Decisions Decisions, along with David Letterman.

The Brady Bunch
Bulifant was the original choice for the role of Carol Brady on ABC's The Brady Bunch, but the part ultimately went to Florence Henderson.

Film 
Bulifant's most popular film roles were as Rosemary in the Disney live-action feature The Happiest Millionaire, in which she sang "Bye-Yum Pum Pum," and in the 1980 comedy Airplane!

She has twice been directed by her son, John Asher, in Diamonds and Tooken, and appeared in a comedic short, The Haircut, opposite John Cassavetes.

Recognition
Bulifant received a Theatre World Award for 1961–1962 for her performance in Whisper to Me.

In 2014, she and her husband Roger Perry were honored with a Golden Palm Star on the Walk of Stars in Palm Springs, California.

Personal life
Bulifant has been married five times:

 Her first husband was actor James MacArthur.  They married on November 2, 1958,  had two children together, Mary MacArthur and Charles MacArthur, and divorced in 1967. 
 Her second husband was Days of Our Lives star Edward Mallory.  They married on September 19, 1969, and had one child, John Mallory Asher.  They divorced in 1974. 
 Her third husband was TV director William Asher. He adopted her son John, giving him the last name of Asher.  She and Asher married August 28, 1976, and divorced in 1993. 
 Her fourth marriage was to Glade Bruce Hansen; they married in 2000 and divorced the next year. 
 Her fifth husband was actor Roger Perry.  They married in 2002 after he divorced his wife of many years, Jo Anne Worley, and remained wed until Perry's death on July 12, 2018.

Bulifant has a grandson, Evan Joseph Asher, from her son John's marriage to Jenny McCarthy.

Advocacy 
Bulifant discovered she had dyslexia in her 40s and has served as a longtime advocate for dyslexia research, including writing two musicals on the subject, Gifts of Greatness and Different Heroes, Different Dreams. Recipients of the Hans Christian Andersen Award, which Bulifant founded to recognize dyslexics who've made a positive contribution to society, include Stephen J. Cannell and Whoopi Goldberg. Bulifant herself is a recipient of the 2015 Broken Glass Award from The Dyslexia Foundation.

She has for many years been actively involved with the child abuse prevention non-profit Childhelp, including serving as a Celebrity Ambassador and as a vice-president on the National Board of Directors.

She also advocates for autism research.

Her memoir, My Four Hollywood Husbands, details the alcoholism of four of her spouses and her recovery from codependent relationships.

Filmography

Theatre

Film

Television

References

External links

 
 
 
 

Living people
20th-century American actresses
21st-century American actresses
Actresses from Virginia
American film actresses
American stage actresses
American television actresses
People from Newport News, Virginia
1937 births